The Anales de Tlatelolco (Annals of Tlatelolco) is a codex manuscript written in Nahuatl, using Latin characters, by anonymous Aztec authors. The text has no pictorial content. Although there is an assertion that the text was a copy of one  written in 1528 in Tlatelolco, only seven years after the fall of the Aztec Empire, James Lockhart argues that there is no evidence for this early date of composition, based on internal evidence of the text. However, he supports the contention that this is an authentic conquest account, arguing that it was composed about 20 years after the conquest in the 1540s, and contemporaneous with the Cuernavaca censuses. Unlike the Florentine Codex and its account of the conquest of the Aztec Empire, the Annals of Tlatelolco remained in Nahua hands, providing authentic insight into the thoughts and outlook of the newly conquered Nahuas.

The document is the only one that contains the day the Aztecs exited Aztlan-Colhuacan, as well as the day of the founding of Mexico-Tenochtitlan.

Its authors preferred to remain anonymous, probably to protect them from the Spanish authorities. It is suspected these authors later became the sources for Bernardino de Sahagún's works.  The priest Ángel María Garibay K. provided one translation of the manuscript into Spanish in 1956, while James Lockhart published the Nahuatl text and a scholarly translation to English in 1991 in We People Here: Nahuatl Accounts of the Conquest of Mexico.

It is also variously known as Unos Annales Históricos de la Nación Mexicana ("Some Historical Annals of the Mexican Nation"), La relación anónima de Tlatelolco, “Manuscript 22”, and the "Tlatelolco Codex" (also a true codex called thus exists).  

The manuscript is held at the Bibliothèque Nationale de France in Paris. The most important publications in Spanish are: the published one by Antigua Libreria de Robredo, Mexico 1948, introduction of Robert Barlow, translation and notes of Henrich Berlin; the most recent by Conaculta, Mexico 2002, translation of Rafael Tena, Col. Cien de México, 207pp.. Background on the text and a popular translation to English for classroom use can be found in The Broken Spears: The Aztec Account of the Conquest of Mexico by Miguel León-Portilla and Lysander Kemp.

References

Aztec codices
1530 books
16th-century history books
History books about the 16th  century
Nahuatl literature
1540s in New Spain
Bibliothèque nationale de France collections